Biliaivka is a city in Odesa Raion, Odesa Oblast, Ukraine. The city had a status of regional significance, also was the administrative center of Biliaivka Raion. It hosts the administration of Biliaivka urban hromada, one of the hromadas of Ukraine. The city is located in the Dniester Delta, on the left bank of the Turunchuk River. Lake Safyany is located near by the city. Population:

History 

The populated place (village at that time) was founded by the Ukrainian Cossacks after the elimination of the Zaporizhian Sich. The village called Holovkivka was first mentioned in 1792. The settlers from the Poltava region were moved here in 1794. The first name of the settlement originated from the name of famous Ukrainian Cossack leader, cossack general judge Antin Holovaty. There are several versions of the name origin, but all the versions are connected with his name.

The village started to be a volost administrative center in Odesa county in 1886. It had a population of 2917 people with 250 farmyards. There were two Orthodox churches, schools, six shops, and markets. The river crossing over the Turunchuk River was here.

The settlement gained town status on 2 January 1957, and city status in 1975. Until 2016, Biliaivka was part of Biliaivka Raion. On 28 January 2016, it was designated the city of oblast significance but remained the administrative center of the raion.

Besides the Ukrainians, the city of Biliaivka has a significant number of Germans, Bulgarians, Greeks and Romani.

Gallery

References

External links 

 Інформаційний портал Біляївки 
 Аліса Ложешник. Спадок родини Антона Андрійовича Головатого – військового судді Чорноморського козацького війська.
 Біляївка — Інформаційно-пізнавальний сайт | Одеська область у складі УРСР (На основі матеріалів енциклопедичного видання про історію міст та сіл України, том – Історія міст і сіл Української РСР. Одеська область. – К.: Головна редакція УРЕ АН УРСР, 1969. – 911 с.)
 ВРУ

 
Cities in Odesa Raion
Kherson Governorate
Populated lakeshore places in Ukraine
Populated riverside places in Ukraine